Fernand Sellier (27 June 1899 – 3 August 1962) was a Belgian racing cyclist. He rode in the 1920 Tour de France.

References

1899 births
1962 deaths
Belgian male cyclists
Place of birth missing